General Luna was an all-girl Filipino rock band. The lineup consisted of Nicole Laurel Asensio on vocals, Caren Mangaran on lead guitar, Audry Dionisio on rhythm guitar, Alex Montemayor on bass guitar, and Bea Lao on drums.

Nicole Laurel Asensio is "the daughter of singer Iwi Laurel, first cousin of actress Denise Laurel, niece of theater artist Cocoy Laurel, and granddaughter of famed opera singer Fides Cuyugan-Asensio." She is also the granddaughter of singer Celia Diaz Laurel. Asensio was the leading lady on Abra's song "Diwata". In 2014, Asensio announced that the group was currently inactive and that she would be pursuing a solo career.

Discography

Studio albums
General Luna (2010)
Different Corners (2012)

Singles
"Red Heaven"
"Nandito"
"Maria"
"Tila"
"Different Corners"
"Santa Baby"

Awards and nominations

References

Bibliography
  

Filipino rock music groups
Musical groups established in 2010
2010 establishments in the Philippines
Musical groups from Metro Manila
Musical groups disestablished in 2013
2013 disestablishments in the Philippines